Cirrhochrista disparalis is a moth in the family Crambidae. It is found in Indonesia, where it has been recorded from the Sula Islands.

References

Moths described in 1865
Spilomelinae
Moths of Indonesia